Sanbon Station is a railway station on Seoul Subway Line 4. It is located in Gunpo city.

It is a main station to access 'Sanbon', a planned satellite city of Korea.
It is between Geumjeong station and Surisan station and was opened on 1 May 1992. In 2015, Gunpo began to construct eight escalators that would be completed in the end of 2015. Sanbon Station is connected with New Core outlet.

Nearby attractions

Sanbon Central Shopping Arcade 
First-time visitors to Gunpo are surprised by the size of their exit from Sanbon Station or approaching the main shopping street via the outer ring road. It is the center of Sanbon which is the place where the word " With the development of Sanbon new city in gunpo area, newly developed central commercial area is one of the places where gunpo citizen is most visited.

The azalea garden in Su-dong, gunpo city is an artificial azalea complex. The site, which has been constructed by planting 150 million yuan of asset, is now becoming a famous spot in Gunpo City.

Station layout

References

Seoul Metropolitan Subway stations
Railway stations opened in 1992
Metro stations in Gunpo